General elections were held in Sikkim in April 1970. The Sikkim National Party emerged as the largest party, winning eight of the 24 seats.

Results

Constituency-wise

Appointed Members
In addition to the elected members, six members were appointed to the Sikkim State Council by the Chogyal, which included: Y. Dorji Dahdul (Chief Secretary), M. M. Rasilly, R. S. Prasad, D. B. Chettri, Pinto Tashi and J. D. Pulger.

Executive Council
From the elected members, the Chogyal appointed six to the Executive Council.

References

Elections in Sikkim
Sikkim
1970s in Sikkim
Election and referendum articles with incomplete results
April 1970 events in Asia